KLED (93.3 FM) is a Gillette, Wyoming, United States, radio station that plays country music from the 1960s, 1970s, 1980s and 1990s, focusing on "the innovators and artists from county music’s Golden Age". The station runs 24 hours a day, 7 days a week. The radio station went on the air March 28, 2012.

The station was planned by owner Legend Communications of Wyoming, LLC, as part of its Basin Radio Network, and serves the Gillette area. They started the station under a construction permit to serve Antelope Valley-Crestview, Wyoming, United States.

References

External links
 

LED
Country radio stations in the United States
Radio stations established in 2012